In optics, the Ewald–Oseen extinction theorem, sometimes referred to as just the extinction theorem, is a theorem that underlies the common understanding of scattering (as well as refraction, reflection, and diffraction). It is named after Paul Peter Ewald and Carl Wilhelm Oseen, who proved the theorem in crystalline and isotropic media, respectively, in 1916 and 1915. Originally, the theorem applied to scattering by an isotropic dielectric objects in free space. The scope of the theorem was greatly extended to encompass a wide variety of bianisotropic media.

Overview 

An important part of optical physics theory is starting with microscopic physics—the behavior of atoms and electrons—and using it to derive the familiar, macroscopic, laws of optics. In particular, there is a derivation of how the refractive index works and where it comes from, starting from microscopic physics. The Ewald–Oseen extinction theorem is one part of that derivation (as is the Lorentz–Lorenz equation etc.).

When light traveling in vacuum enters a transparent medium like glass, the light slows down, as described by the index of refraction. Although this fact is famous and familiar, it is actually quite strange and surprising when you think about it microscopically. After all, according to the superposition principle, the light in the glass is a superposition of:
 The original light wave, and
 The light waves emitted by oscillating electrons in the glass.

(Light is an oscillating electromagnetic field that pushes electrons back and forth, emitting dipole radiation.)

Individually, each of these waves travels at the speed of light in vacuum, not at the (slower) speed of light in glass. Yet when the waves are added up, they surprisingly create only a wave that travels at the slower speed.

The Ewald–Oseen extinction theorem says that the light emitted by the atoms has a component traveling at the speed of light in vacuum, which exactly cancels out ("extinguishes") the original light wave. Additionally, the light emitted by the atoms has a component which looks like a wave traveling at the slower speed of light in glass. Altogether, the only wave in the glass is the slow wave, consistent with what we expect from basic optics.

A more complete description can be found in Classical Optics and its Applications, by Masud Mansuripur.  A  proof of the classical theorem can be found in Principles of Optics, by Born and Wolf., and that of its extension has been presented by Akhlesh Lakhtakia.

Derivation from Maxwell's equations

Introduction 
When an electromagnetic wave enters a dielectric medium, it excites (resonates) the material's electrons whether they are free or bound, setting them into a vibratory state with the same frequency as the wave. These electrons will in turn radiate their own electromagnetic fields as a result of their oscillation (EM fields of oscillating charges). Due to the linearity of Maxwell equations, one expects the total field at any point in space to be the sum of the original field and the field produced by oscillating electrons. This result is, however, counterintuitive to the practical wave one observes in the dielectric moving at a speed of c/n, where n is the medium index of refraction. The Ewald–Oseen extinction theorem seek to address the disconnect by demonstrating how the superposition of these two waves reproduces the familiar result of a wave that moves at a speed of c/n.

Derivation 
The following is a derivation based on a work by Ballenegger and Weber. Let's consider a simplified situation in which a monochromatic electromagnetic wave is normally incident on a medium filling half the space in the region z>0 as shown in Figure 1.

The electric field at a point in space is the sum of the electric fields due to all the various sources. In our case, we separate the fields in two categories based on their generating sources. We denote the incident field

and the sum of the fields generated by the oscillating electrons in the medium

The total field at any point z in space is then given by the superposition of the two contributions,

To match what we already observe,  has this form. However, we already know that inside the medium, z>0, we will only observe what we call the transmitted E-field  which travels through the material at speed c/n.

Therefore in this formalism,

This to say that the radiated field cancels out the incident field and creates a transmitted field traveling within the medium at speed c/n. Using the same logic, outside the medium the radiated field produces the effect of a reflected field  traveling at speed c in the opposite direction to the incident field.

assume that the wavelength is much larger than the average separation of atoms so that the medium can be considered continuous. We use the usual macroscopic E and B fields and take the medium to be nonmagnetic and neutral so that Maxwell's equations read

both the total electric and magnetic fields

the set of Maxwell equations inside the dielectric

where  includes the true and polarization current induced in the material by the outside electric field. We assume a linear relationship between the current and the electric field, hence

The set of Maxwell equations outside the dielectric has no current density term

The two sets of Maxwell equations are coupled since the vacuum electric field appears in the current density term.

For a monochromatic wave at normal incidence, the vacuum electric field has the form

We simplify the double curl in a couple of steps using Einstein summation.

Hence we obtain,

Realizing that all the fields have the same time dependence , the time derivatives are straightforward and we obtain the following inhomogeneous wave equation

with particular solution

For the complete solution, we add to the particular solution the general solution of the homogeneous equation which is a superposition of plane waves traveling in arbitrary directions

where is found from the homogeneous equation to be

Note that we have taken the solution as a coherent superposition of plane waves. Because of symmetry, we expect the fields to be the same in a plane perpendicular to the  axis.

Since there are no boundaries in the region , we expect a wave traveling to the right. The solution to the homogeneous equation becomes,

Adding this to the particular solution, we get the radiated wave inside the medium

The total field at any position  is the sum of the incident and radiated fields at that position. Adding the two components inside the medium, we get the total field

This wave travels inside the dielectric at speed 

We can simplify the above   to a familiar form of the index of refraction of a linear isotropic dielectric. To do so, we remember that in a linear dielectric an applied electric field  induces a polarization  proportional to the electric field .

which implies that the conductivity

which is a more familiar form. For the region , one imposes the condition of a wave traveling to the left. By setting the conductivity in this region   , we obtain the reflected wave

traveling at the speed of light.

Hertz vector approach 
The following is a derivation based on a work by Wangsness  and a similar derivation found in chapter 20 of Zangwill's text, Modern Electrodynamics. The setup is as follows, let the infinite half-space  be vacuum and the infinite half-space  be a uniform, isotropic, dielectric material with electric susceptibility, 

The inhomogeneous electromagnetic wave equation for the electric field can be written in terms of the electric Hertz Potential, in the Lorenz gauge as

The electric field in terms of the Hertz vectors is given as

but the magnetic Hertz vector  is 0 since the material is assumed to be non-magnetizable and there is no external magnetic field. Therefore the electric field simplifies to

To do this, split  in the homogeneous and particular solutions

Linearity then allows us to write

The homogeneous solution, is the initial plane wave traveling with wave vector  in the positive  direction

We do not need to explicitly find since we are only interested in finding the field.

Since the initial electric field is polarizing the material, the polarization vector must have the same space and time dependence  More detail about this assumption is discussed by Wangsness. Plugging this into the integral and expressing in terms of Cartesian coordinates produces

Then using the substitution

and

so the limits become

and

Then introduce a convergence factor  with  into the integrand since it does not change the value of the integral,

Then  implies , hence . Therefore,

Now, plugging this result back into the z-integral yields

This integration must be split into two due to the absolute value  inside the integrand. Again, a convergence factor must be introduced to evaluate both integrals and the result is

Instead of plugging  directly into the expression for the electric field, several simplifications can be made. Begin with the curl of the curl vector identity,

therefore,

Also, notice that the second and third terms are equivalent to the inhomogeneous wave equation, therefore,

Therefore, the total field is

which becomes,

Now focus on the field inside the dielectric. Using the fact that  is complex, we may immediately write

recall also that inside the dielectric we have .

Then by coefficient matching we find,

and

The first relation quickly yields the wave vector in the dielectric in terms of the incident wave as

Both of these results can be substituted into the expression for the electric field to obtain the final expression

This is exactly the result as expected. There is only one wave inside the medium and it has wave speed reduced by n. The expected reflection and transmission coefficients are also recovered.

Extinction lengths and tests of special relativity 

The characteristic "extinction length" of a medium is the distance after which the original wave can be said to have been completely replaced. For visible light, traveling in air at sea level, this distance is approximately 1 mm. In interstellar space, the extinction length for light is 2 light years.  At very high frequencies, the electrons in the medium can't "follow" the original wave into oscillation, which lets that wave travel much further:  for 0.5 MeV gamma rays, the length is 19 cm of air and 0.3 mm of Lucite, and for 4.4 GeV, 1.7 m in air, and 1.4 mm in carbon.

Special relativity predicts that the speed of light in vacuum is independent of the velocity of the source emitting it. This widely believed prediction has been occasionally tested using astronomical observations. For example, in a binary star system, the two stars are moving in opposite directions, and one might test the prediction by analyzing their light.  (See, for instance, the De Sitter double star experiment.)  Unfortunately, the extinction length of light in space nullifies the results of any such experiments using visible light, especially when taking account of the thick cloud of stationary gas surrounding such stars.  However, experiments using X-rays emitted by binary pulsars, with much longer extinction length, have been successful.

References

Physics theorems
Scattering, absorption and radiative transfer (optics)